Sean Byrne was an Irish footballer during the 1920s and 1930s.

Byrne was a tough defender during this era in the League of Ireland and had spells with Bohemians.

He won full international caps for Irish Free State making his debut against Spain in April 1931.

References

Year of birth missing
Year of death missing
Republic of Ireland association footballers
Irish Free State association footballers
Association football defenders
Irish Free State international footballers
League of Ireland players
Bohemian F.C. players